The 1958 Wake Forest Demon Deacons football team was an American football team that represented Wake Forest University during the 1958 NCAA University Division football season. In their third season under head coach Paul Amen, the Demon Deacons compiled a 3–7 record and finished in sixth place in the Atlantic Coast Conference.

Schedule

Team leaders

References

Wake Forest
Wake Forest Demon Deacons football seasons
Wake Forest Demon Deacons football